Yan Shun is a fictional character in Water Margin, one of the Four Great Classical Novels of Chinese literature. Nicknamed "Multicoloured Tiger", he ranks 50th among the 108 Stars of Destiny and 14th among the 72 Earthly Fiends.

Background
Yan Shun, who is nicknamed "Multicoloured Tiger", has reddish brown hair, a yellowish beard, round eyes, long arms, and a wide waist. He fights well, especially with sabre. Initially a trader from Laizhou (萊州; around present-day Yantai, Shandong), he forms a bandit gang at Mount Qingfeng (清風山; in present-day Qingzhou, Shandong). He is subsequently assisted by Wang Ying and Zheng Tianshou.

Meeting Song Jiang
When Song Jiang, on the run from the law after killing his mistress Yan Poxi, is going to Qingfeng Fort (清風寨; near Mount Qingfeng) to take shelter under his friend Hua Rong, he comes by Mount Qingfeng and is captured in a trap by the bandits. They intend to kill him and use his heart to make soup. Just as he is about to be sliced up, Song sighs loudly, "Am I, Song Jiang, destined to die just like this?" Surprised to hear the name of a person he admires for chivalry, Yan Shun interrupts in time to inquire. After confirming Song's identity, the three bandit chiefs quickly free him, apologise to him and treat him as an honoured guest.

As they drink, Wang Ying, who desires pretty women, goes to intercept a group crossing Mount Qingfeng that consists of a sedan chair, which apparently carries a female. Finding the woman attractive, Wang wants to rape her. When the woman says she is the wife of Liu Gao, the governor of Qingfeng Fort, Song Jiang feels obliged to persuade Wang to let her go as Liu is the colleague of Hua Rong, the fort's garrison commandant. Yan Shun agrees with him and pressures Wang to comply. Wang reluctantly agrees.

Joining Liangshan
On the Lantern Festival night, Song Jiang, who is then living in Hua Rong's house, goes outdoor to enjoy the celebrations. Liu Gao's wife spots him and lies to her husband that Song has abducted her at Mount Qingfeng and tried to rape her. Believing his wife, Liu orders Song arrested. After Hua Rong saved Song by force, Liu seeks help from Murong Yanda, the governor of Qingzhou, which oversees Qingfeng Fort. Huang Xin, who is sent to handle the matter, lures Hua to a feast and captures him. Meanwhile, Liu has seized Song again as he tried to sneak to Mount Qingfeng.

When Huang Xin is taking Song Jiang and Hua Rong back to Qingzhou, the bandits of Mount Qingfeng, led by Yan Shun, waylay the escort party, rescue the two prisoners and kill Liu Gao. The bandits later defeat an army sent from Qingzhou led by Qin Ming and seize Mrs Liu after breaking into Qingfeng Fort. Wang Ying again intends to keep Mrs Liu for himself. But he is prevented by Song, who believes she would ruin Wang.  Yan Shun, in agreement with Song, decisively draws a sabre and kills the woman. He nearly has an armed fight with Wang, who is placated only after Song promised to find him a pretty and virtuous wife. As Qingzhou is likely to send a larger force to exterminate them, Song suggests that the group decamp to join Liangshan Marsh. Yan is thus absorbed into the larger band.

Campaigns and death
Yan Shun is appointed as one of the leaders of the Liangshan cavalry after the 108 Stars of Destiny came together in what is called the Grand Assembly. He participates in the campaigns against the Liao invaders and rebel forces in Song territory following amnesty from Emperor Huizong for Liangshan.

In the battle of Black Dragon Ridge (烏龍嶺; northeast of present-day Meicheng Town, Jiande, Zhejiang) in the campaign against Fang La, Yan Shun faces Shi Bao, one of Fang's better warriors who fights with a spiked mace. After Ma Lin was killed by Shi, Yan is eager to avenge his comrade but is fatally smashed by the mace wielder and dies.

References
 
 
 
 
 
 
 

72 Earthly Fiends
Fictional cannibals
Fictional characters from Shandong